Zimní stadion Ústí nad Labem is an indoor sporting arena located in Ústí nad Labem, Czech Republic.  The capacity of the arena is 6,500 people and was renovated in 2004.  It is currently home to the HC Slovan Ústečtí Lvi ice hockey team.

External links
Arena information

Indoor ice hockey venues in the Czech Republic
1956 establishments in Czechoslovakia
Sports venues completed in 1956
20th-century architecture in the Czech Republic